= Gekkhar Suna =

- Town
- Location within Pakistan
- Coordinates: 33.29°N 73.16°E
- Country: Pakistan
- Province: (Islamabad Capital Territory) Islamabad C.T
- Elevation: 548 m (1,798 ft)
- Time zone: UTC+5 (PST)

Gekkhar Suna is a town in the Islamabad Capital Territory of Pakistan. It is located at 33° 29' 10N 73° 16' 20E with an altitude of 548 metres (1801 feet).
